The Mathews–Powell House is a Victorian house located in Queen City, Texas, United States.  The house was dedicated as a Recorded Texas Historic Landmark in 1973 and was listed in the National Register of Historic Places on September 22, 1977.

The house was built in 1878 by William Franklin Mathews (1840-1900) and his wife Harriet India Sharp. Mathews, a Confederate veteran and farmer, moved to Queen City when it was founded (1877) and became a successful merchant. Briefly owned by various people after 1895, the house was bought 1918 by Ross A. Powell (1883-1937) and wife Gussie Boyd (d. 1920). Like Mathews, Powell was a merchant.   The building remained with the Powell family for more than seventy years until it was sold in the 1990s. It now serves as the Antique Rose Bed & Breakfast.

See also

National Register of Historic Places listings in Cass County, Texas
Recorded Texas Historic Landmarks in Cass County

References

Texas Historic Sites Atlas

Houses on the National Register of Historic Places in Texas
Houses in Cass County, Texas
National Register of Historic Places in Cass County, Texas
Recorded Texas Historic Landmarks